Lower Niumi is one of the six districts of the North Bank Division of the Gambia. In the 2013 census, it had a population of 57,358.

References 

 
Districts of the Gambia